Samuel Adolph Cashwan (1900–1988) was an American sculptor.

History 
Born Samual Adolf Cashwan to Jewish parents in Cherkasy, Ukraine, Cashwan's parents left Russia and emigrated to New York City in 1906.  Cashwan began his art studies after the family moved to Detroit in 1916.  His first exposure to art came from his art teacher, Katherine Conover at Detroit's Central High School. Cashwan then took art course at the John Wicker School of Art in Detroit and later at Detroit City College.

In 1918, Cashwan served in the US Army.  He was discharged following the end of World War I and returned to New York City, where he continued with his art training at the Architectural League of New York.  Cashwan then moved to Paris from 1923 to 1926  where he attended the École des Beaux-Arts under the sculptor Antoine Bourdelle.  He returned to Detroit in 1927 and became an art instructor at the University of Michigan.  Cashwan also served as the head of the sculpture department of the Detroit Society of Arts and Crafts until 1942.  Cashwan was also employed by the Works Progress Administration (WPA) from 1936 until 1942 as the supervisor of its sculpture and ceramics program.  He was to credit the income from these teaching positions to allow art to his own tastes rather than that of the art market.

During his time at the WPA, Cashwan created several sculptures for outside display at Michigan State University.  At the Olin Health Center, he created bas-reliefs of the Greek gods Panacea and Hygeia.  AT one of the University entrances, he created a sculpture of a man, a woman, a horse and several sheafs of wheat.  These figures symbolized the university's beginnings as a school of agriculture.

In January, 1942, Cashwan exhibited sculptural work at an opening of the Museum of Modern Art in New York City.

Following the end of World War II, Cashwan was hired as a designer for General Motors, a position that he held until his retirement in 1965.  He moved to North Carolina shortly thereafter, where he lived until his death in 1988.

Cashwan created two prominent sculptures at the 1966 Oldsmobile Administrative Building in Lansing, Michigan: Prometheus in the building's lobby and Open Cage at an important entrance. The Prometheus sculpture signified the spirit of research necessary to industrial progress, and Open Cage signified people working in groups. 

While Cashwan suggested that his work had been influenced by both Romanesque and Hindu sculpture, as his career progress his work developed along more and more abstract lines.  By the late 1930s, his figural work had become very angular, stressing sharp lines and large volumes.  His pieces created following World War II were even more abstract, his later ones having altogether abandoned figural reference.

Like many of the sculptors of his day Cashwan was endowed with both the skills and the opportunity to work with architects and create architectural sculpture.  Buildings adorned by his hand can be found in both Lansing, Michigan and Detroit.

Architectural work

 St. Aloysius Church, Donaldson & Meier architects,  Detroit, Michigan - two Angles on facade  1927
 Water Conditioning Plant, Black & Black architects, Lansing, Michigan,  1938
 Olin Health Center,   Ralph Calder, architect, Michigan State University, East Lansing, Michigan,  1939
 Abbott Street Entrance Marker,  Michigan State University, East Lansing, Michigan  1939
 Edward Denby Memorial, Brodhead Armory, Detroit MI, 1939
 Music Building, Ralph Calder, architect,  Michigan State University, East Lansing, Michigan  1940
 Student Union Addition, Prometheus Frieze, Ralph Calder, architect,  Michigan State University, East Lansing, Michigan

Public monuments
 Brady Memorial, Belle Isle, Detroit MI, 1928
 Abraham Lincoln, Lincoln Consolidated Schools, Augusta Township, Michigan, 1938
 Pioneer Mother, Clare, Michigan, 1938
 Three Musicians, Michigan State University, East Lansing MI  c. 1940
 Miller Memorial, Kellog Building, University of Michigan, Ann Arbor, Michigan, 1940

References

Additional sources
 Barrie, Bentley, Helms and Raspond, Artists in Michigan: 1900-1976, Wayne State University Press, Detroit 1989
 Brunk, Colby, Jacobs et al., Arts and Crafts in Detroit 1906-1976: The Movement, The Society, The School,  Detroit Institute of Arts, Detroit MI 1976
 Colby, Joy Hakanson, Art and a City: A History of the Detroit Society of Arts and Crafts, Wayne State University Press, Detroit MI  1956
 Doyle, Right Reverend John M., Saint Aloysius Church: The Old and the New, Centennial Publishing Company, Detroit  1930
 Hendry, Fay L., Outdoor Sculpture in Lansing, iota Press, Okamos, Michigan  1980
 Kvaran, Einar Einarsson,  Architectural Sculpture in America, unpublished manuscript
 Miller, Dorothy C., ed. Americans 1942: 18 Artists From 9 States, Museum of Modern Art, New York  1942
 Smith, Dorothy Hitchingham, Footsteps From the Past, mimeographed booklet  1975

External links

 Official website

1900 births
American people of Ukrainian-Jewish descent
Ukrainian Jews
Jewish sculptors
Emigrants from the Russian Empire to the United States
People from Cherkasy
Wayne State University alumni
1988 deaths
University of Michigan faculty
Federal Art Project artists
American alumni of the École des Beaux-Arts
20th-century American sculptors
19th-century American sculptors
19th-century American male artists
American male sculptors
20th-century American male artists